What Sound is the third album by English electronic music group Lamb, released in October 2001

Original members Andy Barlow and Lou Rhodes are joined by session musicians Arto Lindsay on guitar, Me'Shell NdegéOcello on bass, and Michael Franti with additional vocal work. Doves guitarist Jimi Goodwin, producers Guy Sigsworth, Nellee Hooper and Richard Dorfmeister (one half of Kruder & Dorfmeister) also contributed to the album. The track "Heaven" was used frequently on the HBO television series Six Feet Under.

Track listing

A hidden track called "Blessing in Disguise" follows a period of silence after the final track.

Note: Some editions do not feature the track "Written".

Deluxe Edition track listing
 "What Sound" – (3:44)
 "One" – (4:16)
 "Sweet" –  (3:53)
 "I Cry" – (5:25)
 "Scratch Bass" – (4:47)
 "Heaven" – (5:00)
 "Small" – (5:21)
 "Gabriel" – (4:20)
 "Sweetheart" – (4:09)
 "Just Is" – (4:11)
 "Gabriel" (MJ Cole mix) – (7:03)
 "Written" – (3:36)
 "Night Has a Thousand Eyes" – (5:42)
 "Gabriel" (Nellee Hooper mix) – (4:03)
 "Blessing in Disguise" – (1:44)
 "Gabriel" (Video)
 "Sweet" (Video)
 "Trans Fatty Acid" (Kruder & Dorfmeister session mix) (video)
 "Cottonwool" (Fila Brazillia mix) (video)
 "Sweet" (Soulchild Radio mix) (video)
 "Heaven" (Funkstörung mix) (video)

2002 Australian limited edition

Charts

Weekly charts

Year-end charts

References

2001 albums
Lamb (band) albums
Mercury Records albums
Albums produced by Guy Sigsworth